Ronan Labar (born 3 May 1989) is a French badminton player. He won the French National Badminton Championships in the mixed doubles event in 2013, 2015 and 2017; also in the men's doubles event in 2014, 2015 and 2020.

Achievements

European Championships 
Mixed doubles

BWF World Tour 
The BWF World Tour, which was announced on 19 March 2017 and implemented in 2018, is a series of elite badminton tournaments sanctioned by the Badminton World Federation (BWF). The BWF World Tour is divided into levels of World Tour Finals, Super 1000, Super 750, Super 500, Super 300 (part of the HSBC World Tour), and the BWF Tour Super 100.

Mixed doubles

BWF Grand Prix 
The BWF Grand Prix had two levels, the Grand Prix and Grand Prix Gold. It was a series of badminton tournaments sanctioned by the Badminton World Federation (BWF) and played between 2007 and 2017.

Men's doubles

Mixed doubles

  BWF Grand Prix Gold tournament
  BWF Grand Prix tournament

BWF International Challenge/Series 
Men's doubles

Mixed doubles

  BWF International Challenge tournament
  BWF International Series tournament
  BWF Future Series tournament

References

External links 
 

1989 births
Living people
People from Châtenay-Malabry
Sportspeople from Hauts-de-Seine
French male badminton players
Badminton players at the 2019 European Games
European Games competitors for France
21st-century French people